Destination Unknown is  a work of spy fiction by Agatha Christie and first published in the UK by the Collins Crime Club on 1 November 1954 and in US by Dodd, Mead and Company in 1955 under the title of So Many Steps to Death. The UK edition retailed at ten shillings and sixpence (10/6) and the US edition at $2.75.

The novel opens in Morocco, where Hilary Craven is staying after a failed marriage. She plans to commit suicide, but is instead recruited by the British secret service for a mission. She is asked to impersonate the wife of a nuclear scientist who has recently disappeared. Hilary is soon transported to meet her new "husband".

Reviews at the time of publication in 1954-1955 found the novel timely, and clearly more fun for Mrs Christie to write than her usual mystery novels. One reviewer was clear in saying that mystery novels were her strong suit and this type of novel was not, yet it was worth reading. A later review, by Robert Barnard, felt the novel started well, but digressed as it found its way to the resolution, and “topples into hokum”. He mentioned the highly valued scientists who worked at Los Alamos during World War II on the atomic bomb and disappeared when peace came as the premise for the novel; Bruno Pontecorvo, who defected to the Soviet Union in 1950, and Klaus Fuchs, theoretical physicist who sent secret information to the Soviet Union and was imprisoned about that same time for that crime.

It is one of only four Christie novels not to have received an adaptation of any kind, the others being Death Comes as the End, Passenger to Frankfurt, and Postern of Fate.

Plot summary
Hilary Craven, a deserted wife and bereaved mother, is planning suicide in a Moroccan hotel. British secret agent Jessop picks the lock of her door to propose that she undertakes a dangerous mission as an alternative to taking an overdose of sleeping pills. The task, which she accepts, is to impersonate the wife of Thomas Betterton, a nuclear scientist who has disappeared and may have defected to the Soviet Union. Soon she finds herself in a group of oddly-assorted travellers being transported to the unknown destination of the title.

The destination is a secret scientific research facility disguised as a modern leper colony and medical research center at a remote location in the Atlas Mountains. The scientists are well-treated and supplied with all equipment needed for their research, but they are not allowed to leave the facility for any reason. They are locked in secret areas deep inside the Mountains whenever government officials and other outsiders visit. Hilary Craven successfully passes herself as Betterton's wife Olive, because he is miserable and wants desperately to escape. He says he cannot do his best work without freedom.

Hilary discovers that the facility was built by the fabulously wealthy and somewhat villainous Mr Aristides, for financial rather than political ends. He has lured many of the world's best young scientists to it with various deceptions so that he can later sell their services back to the world's governments and corporations for a huge profit. She falls in love with Andrew Peters, a handsome young American and a research chemist who travels in the group with her to the facility.

With the help of clues that Hilary has left along the route to the secret facility and local Berbers who find those clues for him, Jessop, with diplomats from nations losing young scientists, locates the facility, tours it, and breaks that wall of separation. Jessop rescues Hilary and the others held there. Peters proves to be Boris Glydr of Poland, using an assumed name and speaking American English. He is on a mission for his late cousin Elsa. He wants Betterton to face justice for the murder of his first wife, Glydr's cousin Elsa. Betterton is not a creative, world-class scientist, having fraudulently announced the discovery of ZE Fission as his own after plagiarising his wife Elsa's work. Betterton is arrested. Hilary no longer wants to die, rediscovering her desire to live; she and Peters are free to begin their life together.

Characters
 Mr Jessop, a British security agent
 Thomas Betterton, a young scientist who has recently disappeared
 Olive Betterton, his second wife who wishes to join him
 Boris Glydr, the Polish cousin of Thomas Betterton's deceased first wife, Elsa
 Hilary Craven, a woman with looks similar to Olive, recently lost her only child and her husband left her
 Mrs Calvin Baker, a seemingly typical American tourist, who is actually a major player in the events that unfold, and who harbors great resentment and hatred for her native country
 Janet Hetherington, a dour English traveller, really a British agent
 Henri Laurier, a gallant Frenchman
 Mr Aristides, one of the world's wealthiest men with his hands in many different pots worldwide
 Andrew Peters, a young research chemist
 Torquil Ericsson, a Norwegian idealist
 Dr Louis Barron, a Frenchman dedicated to bacteriological research
 Helga Needheim, an arrogant German scientist
 Paul Van Heidem, a social manager at the facility
 Dr Nielson, the deputy director, in charge of administration
 The Director, a charismatic speaker employed by Aristides
 M. LeBlanc, a French investigator who works with Jessop

Major themes

This book explores the 1950s subject of defection to the Soviets, but it also demonstrates how the break-up of Christie's first marriage in the 1920s remained with her. Like her 1934 Mary Westmacott novel Unfinished Portrait, it starts with a youngish woman who has married, had a daughter and whose husband has replaced her with someone else.

In both books, a young man displays remarkable perceptiveness in spotting her intention to end her life and defies convention to save her, not only in tackling a stranger on intimate matters but in spending time in the woman's hotel bedroom to talk her out of suicide. In this story he talks her into espionage instead.

Literary significance and reception

Philip John Stead writing in The Times Literary Supplement in its review of 19 November 1954, was enthusiastic about the novel in posing the question, "Where do scientists go when they vanish from the ken of the Security Services? A solution to this fascinating problem is propounded in Destination Unknown. While it must be admitted that the secret, when disclosed, smacks rather of The Thousand and One Nights than of modern international rivalry for scientific talents, it may surely be excused on the ground that it provides Mrs Christie with a story-tellers holiday from the rigours of detective fiction. Readers may regret the absence of the tonic logicalities of crime's unravelling – though "clues" are not altogether missing – for the secret service story belongs largely to Adventure, but in their place is the author's obvious pleasure in the wider horizons of the more romantic genre." The review concluded, "However much the purist yearns for Poirot or Miss Marple, he can hardly deplore Mrs Christie's bright, busy excursion into this topical and extravagant sphere."

Maurice Richardson of The Observer of 31 October 1954, said, "The thriller is not Agatha Christie's forte; it makes her go all breathless and naïve." He concluded, "Needs to be read indulgently in a very comfortable railway carriage. She probably had a delicious busman's holiday writing it."

Robert Barnard wrote, "Slightly above-average thriller, with excellent beginning (heroine, whose husband has left her for another woman, and whose small daughter had died, contemplates suicide in strange hotel). Thereafter topples over into hokum, with a notably unexciting climax. Mainly concerns disappearing scientists – it is written in the wake of the Fuchs/Pontecorvo affairs. Mentions the un-American Activities Committee, without obvious disapproval." Barnard refers to Bruno Pontecorvo, a pioneering nuclear scientist who worked with the Allies in World War II then defected to the Soviet Union in 1950 and Klaus Fuchs, theoretical physicist who was also in Los Alamos during World War II, but sent secret knowledge to the Soviet Union and went to prison for that in 1950.

Publication history
 1954, Collins Crime Club (London), 1 November 1954, Hardback, 192 pp
 1955, Dodd Mead and Company (New York), 1955, Hardback, 212 pp
 1956, Pocket Books (New York), Paperback, 183 pp
 1958, Fontana Books (Imprint of HarperCollins), Paperback, 191 pp
 1969, Ulverscroft Large-print Edition, Hardcover, 203 pp
 1977, Greenway edition of collected works (William Collins), Hardcover, 196 pp 
 1978, Greenway edition of collected works (Dodd Mead), Hardcover, 196 pp
 May 1983, Pocket Books, paperback, 237 pp, 

In the UK the novel was first serialised in the weekly magazine John Bull in five abridged instalments from 25 September (Volume 96, Number 2517) to 23 October 1954 (Volume 96, Number 2521) with illustrations by William Little.

The novel was first serialised in the US in the Chicago Tribune in fifty-one parts from Tuesday, 12 April to Thursday 9 June 1955 under the title of Destination X.

References

External links
Destination Unknown at the official Agatha Christie website

Novels by Agatha Christie
1954 British novels
British spy novels
Works originally published in John Bull (magazine)
Novels first published in serial form
Collins Crime Club books
Novels set in Morocco
Uxoricide in fiction